The Hungarian LGBT Alliance is an umbrella organization that brings together gay, lesbian, bisexual and transgender organizations in Hungary. It was founded on January 25, 2009, and currently has seven member organizations.

Member organizations
Atlasz Lesbian, Gay, Bisexual and Transgender Sport Association
Háttér Society
Labrisz Lesbian Association
Patent Association
Szimpozion LGBT Youth Association
Rainbow Mission Foundation
Rainbow Families Foundation

Activities
In 2016, similarly to other NGOs in the country, the Alliance campaigned for an invalid vote in the referendum on refugee quotas.

References

LGBT political advocacy groups in Hungary
LGBT in Hungary